This is a list of places of interest in Cornwall, England. See List of places in Cornwall for a list of settlements in the county.

Places of interest

See also
 List of farms in Cornwall
 List of museums in Cornwall
 List of windmills in Cornwall

 
Cornwall-related lists
Cornwall